Antonio Natalucci Berroa (born 1 August 2000) is a professional footballer who plays as a defender for the Dominican Republic national team. Born in Italy, he represents the Dominican Republic at international level.

Club career
Developed in youth academies of Lazio and Frosinone, Natalucci joined Serie D club Nardò during 2019–20 season.

Natalucci joined Serie C side Triestina ahead of 2020–21 season and made his professional debut on 27 September 2020 in a 1–0 league defeat against Matelica.

On 6 October 2020, Novara announced the signing of Natalucci on a season long loan deal.

On 31 January 2022, Natalucci moved to Monopoli.

International career
Natalucci was born in Italy to an Italian father and a Dominican mother. On 27 October 2020, Natalucci received maiden call-up to the Dominican Republic national team.

Career statistics

International

References

External links
 

2000 births
Living people
Italian people of Dominican Republic descent
Sportspeople of Dominican Republic descent
Citizens of the Dominican Republic through descent
Footballers from Rome
Italian footballers
Dominican Republic footballers
Association football defenders
Serie D players
Serie C players
S.S. Lazio players
Frosinone Calcio players
U.S. Triestina Calcio 1918 players
Novara F.C. players
Cavese 1919 players
S.S. Monopoli 1966 players
Dominican Republic international footballers